Marie-Louise Kehoe (born December 12, 1928) is a former member of the Massachusetts House of Representatives. She was first elected in 1982 and was reelected in every election through 1992, after which she chose to step down.

She also served for many years as a selectman in Dedham, Massachusetts and was the grand marshal of the 2009 Flag Day Parade.

References

Democratic Party members of the Massachusetts House of Representatives
1928 births
Living people
20th-century American politicians
Dedham, Massachusetts selectmen